Stentor is a figure from Greek mythology.

Stentor can also refer to:
 2146 Stentor, asteroid
 Stentor Alliance, alliance of telecommunications companies in Canada
 Stentor, genus of large, unicellular, ciliate protozoa
 Armstrong Siddeley Stentor, liquid-fuelled rocket engine used in the Blue Steel missile
 The Stentor, student-run newspaper at Lake Forest College
 a newsreader for the 19th century Austro-Hungarian Telefon Hírmondó (telephone news service), who would need a loud voice to communicate over unamplified signals.
 Stentor, a  PACS in the US Health industry.
  Stentor has also been used in organs for a type of very loud flue stop, and for a department of such stops as in the "Stentor Division" in the Wanamaker Organ.
  Les Stentors, a French vocal music group